This article is about the particular significance of the year 1724 to Wales and its people.

Incumbents
Lord Lieutenant of North Wales (Lord Lieutenant of Anglesey, Caernarvonshire, Denbighshire, Flintshire, Merionethshire, Montgomeryshire) – Hugh Cholmondeley, 1st Earl of Cholmondeley 
Lord Lieutenant of Glamorgan – vacant until 1729
Lord Lieutenant of Brecknockshire and Lord Lieutenant of Monmouthshire – Sir William Morgan of Tredegar
Lord Lieutenant of Cardiganshire – John Vaughan, 2nd Viscount Lisburne
Lord Lieutenant of Carmarthenshire – vacant until 1755 
Lord Lieutenant of Pembrokeshire – Sir Arthur Owen, 3rd Baronet
Lord Lieutenant of Radnorshire – James Brydges, 1st Duke of Chandos

Bishop of Bangor – William Baker
Bishop of Llandaff – John Tyler (until 8 July)
Bishop of St Asaph – John Wynne
Bishop of St Davids – Richard Smalbroke (from 3 February)

Events
14 September - Robert Clavering, a canon of Christ Church, Oxford, is nominated to succeed John Tyler as Bishop of Llandaff.
The Shire Hall, Monmouth, is built.
A charity school is built at Caerleon as the result of a bequest from Charles Williams.
The title of Baron Bergavenny is inherited by William Nevill.

Arts and literature

New books
William Wynne - The Life of Sir Leoline Jenkins

Births
26 April (baptised) - Joshua Eddowes, printer and bookseller (died 1811)
17 May - Gabriel Jones, Welsh American lawyer, legislator, court clerk and civil servant (died 1806) 
22 September - John Parry, lawyer and politician (died 1797)
4 December - Princess Louise of Wales, daughter of the Prince and Princess of Wales (died 1751)
date unknown - George Rice, politician (died 1779)

Deaths
8 January - Mary Herbert, Marchioness of Powis, age unknown
22 March - John Evans, Bishop of Bangor and Meath, 73?
1 June - Erasmus Saunders, clergyman, 54?
4 June - Richard Bulkeley, 4th Viscount Bulkeley, 41
8 July - John Tyler, Bishop of Llandaff, 84
15 December - Stephen Parry, MP for Cardigan Boroughs, 49
date unknown - Jeremiah Jones, independent tutor and biblical critic, 30/31

References

1720s in Wales
Years of the 18th century in Wales